Stuart Edward Ripley (born 20 November 1967) is an English former professional footballer who played as a winger from 1985 until 2002, notably in the Premier League for Blackburn Rovers and Southampton. He was part of the Rovers squad that won the title in the 1994–95 season. Prior to this he had played just under 250 times in the Football League for Middlesbrough. He also appeared professionally for Barnsley and Sheffield Wednesday. He earned two national caps for England.

Ripley retired from professional football in 2002 and after working as a sports physio is now working as a solicitor.

Club career

Middlesbrough
Ripley first made his name with Middlesbrough in the late 1980s, before achieving success in a £1.3 million move to Blackburn Rovers, helping them to the league title in the 1994–95 season and becoming a cult hero. In the 1991–1992 season he helped Middlesbrough achieve promotion to the newly founded Premier League, as well as playing an important role in Middlesbrough getting through to the League Cup semi-final. They also reached the fifth round of the FA Cup losing in a replay to Portsmouth.

Blackburn Rovers
During the summer of 1992, Ripley was signed by Blackburn Rovers who had achieved promotion along with Middlesbrough. He was briefly their record signing until later in July they signed Alan Shearer for £3.3million. On his debut for Blackburn, he scored the club's first Premier League goal, opening their scoring a 3–3 draw with Crystal Palace at Selhurst Park.

Southampton
In 1998, aged almost 31, he moved to Southampton, and retiring four years later. He scored one goal for Southampton against Derby County on 4 October 1999. He also served loan spells at Barnsley (twice) – scoring in his debut, a 1–2 home loss to former side Blackburn – and Sheffield Wednesday, where he scored once against Crystal Palace.

International career
He was capped twice by England as a full international; against San Marino on 17 November 1993 and against Moldova on 10 September 1997.

Personal life
After finishing his playing career, Ripley set up the Castleford Physiotherapy & Sports Injury Clinic, providing physiotherapy to nearby rugby league teams, as well as local football teams.
He graduated from the University of Central Lancashire in 2007, with a first class combined honours degree in Law and French.

His son, Connor Ripley, is a goalkeeper and plays for Preston North End.

In 2010 Ripley became a qualified solicitor. He is a member of FA's Judicial Panel hearing cases relating to matters such as doping, safeguarding, agent activity and discrimination.

Career statistics

Honours
Middlesbrough
Full Members' Cup runner-up: 1989–90
 
Blackburn Rovers
Premier League: 1994–95

References

External links

Middlesbrough archives

1967 births
Living people
Footballers from Middlesbrough
Alumni of the University of Central Lancashire
English footballers
Association football wingers
Premier League players
Middlesbrough F.C. players
Bolton Wanderers F.C. players
Blackburn Rovers F.C. players
Southampton F.C. players
Barnsley F.C. players
Sheffield Wednesday F.C. players
England international footballers
England under-21 international footballers
English solicitors